Istiratumab (MM-141) is an experimental monoclonal antibody for the treatment of cancer. It is a bispecific antibody targeting IGF-1R and ErbB3.

It is in development by Merrimack Pharmaceuticals and was awarded orphan drug status for pancreatic cancer.

References

Experimental cancer drugs
Monoclonal antibodies
Orphan drugs